Reading Regional Airport  (also known as Carl A. Spaatz Field) is a public airport three miles (5 km) northwest of Reading, in Bern Township, Berks County, Pennsylvania. It is owned by the Reading Regional Airport Authority.

Federal Aviation Administration records say the airport had 2,268 passenger boardings in calendar year 2006, 2,445 in 2005 and 9,288 in 2004. The airport had scheduled flights on US Airways Express carrier Air Midwest, which ended on September 3, 2004. The airport is now served by three charter airlines.

Charter airlines
Dyne-Air Charter
Millennium Aviation
Reading Air Charter
Southwest Airlines (Orlando) chartered by Boscov's Travel.

Cargo

Facilities

In 2006 the airport had 124,650 aircraft operations, average 341 per day: 91% general aviation, 5% air taxi, 3% military, 1% commuter/cargo and <1% scheduled commercial. 177 aircraft are based at the airport: 63% single-engine, 21% multi-engine, 11% jet, 2% helicopter, 2% ultralight and 1% glider.

History

Opened as a civil airport in April 1938, Reading Airport was used by the United States Army Air Forces First Air Force as a training airfield during World War II.

Reading Army Air Field opened on 1 June 1943, with the 309th Base Headquarters and Air Base Squadron as its host unit. The mission was to train tactical reconnaissance units. The 26th Tactical Reconnaissance Group was activated on the airfield the same date, with the 37th, 39th, 40th and 91st Photo Reconnaissance Squadrons.

Aircraft used for training were the Curtiss O-52 Owl; Douglas O-53 Havoc; Douglas O-46, and the Stinson O-49 Vigilant. The 72d Liaison Squadron, flying the Aeronca O-58 Grasshopper arrived on 7 June and remained assigned to the station until 29 July 1943 when it was assigned to Camp Mackall, North Carolina.

On 11 November 1943 the 26th was reassigned to Camp Campbell, Kentucky to train with the 101st Airborne Division before deploying to England, and engaging in combat operations as part of Ninth Air Force. It was replaced by the 11th Photographic Group on 1 December 1943. The 11th Photo Group used Reading as its worldwide headquarters, as its reconnaissance and photo squadrons were deployed to various parts of the world.

On 1 January 1944 Reading AAF was reassigned to Air Technical Service Command and became a sub-base of the Middletown Air Depot near Harrisburg. The mission of the station became to repair and overhaul aircraft and return them to active service. The 11th Photo Group moved out to MacDill Field, Florida.

On 1 June 1944 the 309th Air Base Squadron was disbanded and replaced by the 4109th Army Air Forces Base Unit (Base Administration). Activity at Reading was phased down in summer 1945, and with the war ending it was inactivated as an active military airfield on 26 February 1946 and designated as an Air Force Reserve base. On that date the field was turned over to Air Defense Command, Eleventh Air Force as a reserve airfield, and the 438th AAF Base Unit (Reserve Training) (later the 2237th Air Force Reserve Training Center) was organized to coordinate reserve training. On 1 January 1948 jurisdiction was transferred to the ADC First Air Force.

During the late 1940s a series of reserve bombardment groups were assigned to the airport:

 On 24 May 1946 the 148th Fighter Squadron, Pennsylvania Air National Guard was assigned to the Airport. It was formerly the Twelfth Air Force 347th Fighter Squadron which was inactivated on 7 November 1945 prior to being re designated and turned over to the Air National Guard. The squadron was activated at the airport on 22 April 1947 with P (later F-47) Thunderbolts under the 112th Fighter Group at Pittsburgh Airport. On 10 February 1951 the squadron was federalized due to the Korean War and brought to active duty at Dover AFB, Delaware. It was released from active duty on 1 November 1952 and was re-equipped with the P-51 Mustang for interceptor duty. In 1956, as propeller driven F-51 Mustang fighters faded into history, the unit was re-designated the 140th Aeromedical Transport Squadron, flying the C-46 Commando and later the C-119 Flying Boxcar. In 1964, the unit relocated to its current location at Olmsted Air National Guard Base (present day Harrisburg International Airport)
 322d Bombardment Group (Light), 9 August 1947 – 27 June 1949, Flew the A-26 Invader
 59th, 451st and 452d Bombardment Squadrons. Also had the 55th Troop Carrier Group assigned, but never equipped.

 319th Bombardment Group (Light), 27 June-2 September 1949, Flew the A-26 Invader
 49th and 51st Bombardment Squadrons

 512th Troop Carrier Group (Combat Cargo), 2 September 1949 – 1 May 1950, Flew the C-46 Commando
 1st, 2d, 3d and 4th Combat Cargo Squadrons

Due to budgetary cutbacks the Reserve Training Center at Reading was inactivated on 1 May 1950 and reassigned to New Castle County Airport, Delaware. The Air Force closed its facilities at Reading airport and it returned to civil control.

In the 1950s Reading Air Services sponsored the National Maintenance & Operations Meeting, better known as the Reading Airshow, and later Reading Aerofest. The annual airshow was one of the largest in the United States through the sixties and seventies peaking at 100,000 in attendance in 1976. The show expanded to a week long trade and airshow, then declined and ended in 1980 as infrastructure was overwhelmed and prices escalated. It was revived again in 1985 as a smaller airshow, the Reading Aerofest, ending in 1998.

On 5 December 1984 Reading Airport was dedicated as Carl Andrew Spaatz Field. Carl Spaatz was a nearby Boyertown, Pennsylvania native and a World War II General. General Spaatz was the first Chief of Staff of the United States Air Force.

Since the 1950s the airport has been home to the Reading Composite Squadron (Pennsylvania Wing designation Squadron 811) of the U.S. Civil Air Patrol.

In the 1950s TWA, Capital and Colonial (then Eastern) stopped at Reading. Allegheny replaced Capital in 1960, TWA left in late 1962, Eastern left in 1969, and Reading dropped out of the OAG in 2004. It may never have had a scheduled jet.

Mid-Atlantic Air Museum 
The Mid-Atlantic Air Museum is located at Reading Airport.   It collects and actively restores historic war planes and classic airliners as well as rare civilian and military aircraft, with large number of historic aircraft on display to the public.  It has also embarked on an ambitious project to restore its P-61B-1-NO Black Widow, recovered from New Guinea in 1989, to flying condition.

See also

 Pennsylvania World War II Army Airfields

References

 Maurer, Maurer (1983). Air Force Combat Units Of World War II. Maxwell AFB, Alabama: Office of Air Force History. .
 Maurer, Maurer (1969), Combat Squadrons of the Air Force, World War II, Air Force Historical Studies Office, Maxwell AFB, Alabama. 
 Air Force Historical Research Agency records search, Reading Army Airfield
Mid Atlantic Air Museum

External links

Official website
Reading Regional Airport at Pennsylvania Bureau of Aviation

Airports established in 1938
Airfields of the United States Army Air Forces in Pennsylvania
Airports in Pennsylvania
Transportation buildings and structures in Berks County, Pennsylvania